Elections were held in 1996 for both Senators and Deputies to the States of Jersey.

Senator Elections

Pierre Horsfall 14,681
Corrie Stein 11,213
Len Norman 11,017
Wendy Kinnard 10,520
Frank Walker 10,295
Nigel Quérée 9,761
Terry Le Main 9,578
Mike Vibert 8,709
David Moon 8,707
Gary Matthews 6,463
Bob Little 4,872
Mike Dun 1,948
Geoff Southern 1,429

Deputy Elections

St Helier Number One District

Paul Routier 721 votes
Jerry Dorey 565 votes
Deputy Ron Blampied 486 votes
Glenn George 306 votes
Harry Cole 274 votes

St Helier Number two district

Terry Le Main 669 votes
Jimmy Johns 645 votes
Simon Crowcroft 391 votes
Dereck Carter 325 votes
Jimmy Barker 190 votes

St Helier Number three and four district

Jacqui Huet 1,384 votes
Shirley Baudains 1,238 votes
Terry Le Sueur 1,175 votes
Graeme Rabet 987 votes
Gary Matthews 812 votes
Geraint Jennings 568 votes
Geoff Southern 241 votes

St Saviour Number one district

St Saviour Number two district

St Saviour Number three district

St Brelade Number one district

St Brelade Number two district

St Clement

Grouville

St John

St Lawrence

St Martin

St Mary

St Ouen

St Peter

Trinity

References

General 1996
1996 elections in Europe
General election